Rockets' Red Glare and similar phrases could refer to:

"...Rockets' Red Glare...", a phrase from the national anthem of the United States, "The Star-Spangled Banner"
Rocket's Red Glare, a 2000 American television film
Rockets Red Glare, Canadian alternative rock band
Rockets Redglare (1949–2001), born Michael Morra, American character actor and stand-up comedian
The Rockets' Red Glare: When America Goes to War, the Presidents and the People, a 1990 book by Richard Barnet

See also
Red Rockets Glare, a recording studio in Los Angeles, California
Rocket Red, a fictional character in the DC Comics Universe